Mootz may refer to:

Mootz Candies, in Pottsville, Pennsylvania 
Mathis Mootz (born 1976), German electronic musician and DJ
Mónica Spear Mootz (1984–2014), Venezuelan model